The dusky spiny tree rat (Makalata obscura) is a species of rodent in the family Echimyidae. It is endemic to Brazil.

The etymology of the species name corresponds to the Latin word obscurus meaning dark.

References

Makalata
Mammals of Brazil
Endemic fauna of Brazil
Mammals described in 1840
Taxa named by Johann Andreas Wagner
Taxonomy articles created by Polbot